Exile (titled Exiles in the U.K. edition) is a 1930 best-selling novel by English writer Warwick Deeping.  According to Publishers Weekly it was the second best-selling novel in the United States in 1930.

The story revolves around a group of English expatriates who have gone to the Italian Riviera.

References

External links
 

1930 British novels
Novels set in Liguria
Novels by Warwick Deeping
Cassell (publisher) books
Alfred A. Knopf books
Ryerson Press books